Legio II Armeniaca (from Armenia) was a legion of the late Roman Empire. This legion may have been garrisoned in the Roman province of Armenia, but later, together with its twin, I Armeniaca, it was moved into the field army as a pseudocomitatensis legion. The legion is reported to have built a camp in Satala. According to Ammianus Marcellinus, in 360 AD. II Armeniaca was stationed in Bezabde with II Flavia Virtutis and II Parthica. When Shapur II besieged and conquered the city, killing many of the inhabitants. The II Armeniaca however, survived, since it is cited in the Notitia Dignitatum as being under the command of the Dux Mesopotamiae.

See also
List of Roman legions

References 

02 Armeniaca
Comitatenses